In the US, a Basic Trading Area is a geographic region defined originally in the Rand McNally Commercial Atlas and Marketing Guide and used by the FCC where a Personal Communications Service can operate. It consists of the counties surrounding a city designated as the basic trading center.

Source:
Note: The Major Trading Area (MTA) numbers in this table are based on alphabetical sorting, rather than population.

References

Federal Communications Commission
Mobile technology
Telecommunications in the United States